Henry Theodore Kellogg was an American lawyer and politician from New York.

Life
He was the son of Sylvester Alonzo Kellogg (1838–1904, justice of the New York Supreme Court) and Susan Elizabeth (Averill) Kellogg. Henry Kellogg received his preliminary education at Vermont Episcopal Institute and Rock Point Military Academy, both in Burlington, Vermont. He then attended Harvard University, graduating cum laude in 1889 with a Bachelor of Arts. He received a Bachelor of Laws from Harvard Law School three years later in 1892. Following graduation he moved to Plattsburgh, New York and joined his father's law office, the firm of Kellogg, Weed and Palmer. On March 5, 1903, he married Katharine Miller Weed.

On June 16, 1903, he was appointed by Governor Odell a justice of the New York Supreme Court (4th District) to fill the vacancy caused by the resignation of his father, and was elected as a Republican to a full term in November of the same year. From 1918 on, he sat on the Appellate Division, Third Dept.

In 1926, he was elected on the Republican and Democratic tickets to the New York Court of Appeals. He resigned on May 16, 1934 due to ill health.

He was buried at the Riverside Cemetery in Plattsburgh.

Sources
 NY Court of Appeals biography
JUSTICE SUCCEEDED BY SON in NYT on June 17, 1903
DEATH LIST OF A DAY.; Ex-Justice Kellogg in NYT on March 13, 1904
EX-JUDGE KELLOGG DIES UP-STATE, 73 in NYT on September 7, 1942 (subscription required)
 Political Graveyard

Judges of the New York Court of Appeals
Harvard Law School alumni
1869 births
1942 deaths
People from Champlain, New York
New York Supreme Court Justices
New York (state) Republicans